Kardum is a Croatian surname. Notable people with the surname include:

 Ivan Kardum (born 1987), Croatian footballer
 Maria Kardum (born 1968), Swedish swimmer
 Teo Kardum (born 1986), Croatian footballer

Croatian surnames